Islah or Al-Islah  (الإصلاح ,إصلاح) is an Arabic word, usually translated as "reform", in the sense of "to improve, to better, to put something into a better position, fundamentalism, correction, correcting something and removing vice, reworking, emendation, reparation, restoration, rectitude, probility, reconciliation." It is an important term in Islam.  The Islamic concept of "Islah" advocates for moral advancement through a reformation based on the rudimental standards of the Qur'an, Sunnah and is characterised by an attitude of bypassing classical legal works in preference of the literature from the early Muslim generations (Salaf al-Salih). Islahi ulema opposes Taqlid, strongly argue for the necessity of Ijtihad and are often referred to as "Salafis".

The word is opposite to the word Ifsad, another important Islamic term meaning "corruption". It is also used in politics (including as a name for political parties), and is also used as a personal and place name.

Etymology
According to author Josef W. Meri and other scholars, the word is derived from the root salaha Ṣ-L-Ḥ (ص ل ح), occurs in forty verses of the Qur'an, including 49:10, 4:114, 4:128, 11:88 where it means "to do good, proper, right, restore oneself or to reconcile people with one another, to make peace."

In sura Al-Hud, it is mentioned as Islamic prophet Shuaib told to his community,

Relation with tajdid
Tajdid, meaning renewal, is another Islamic term used with the term islah in the field of different Islamic political interpretation. The person who practices tajdid is called mujaddid (renewer),  but scholars such as Al-Dhahabi and Ibn Hajar al-Asqalani have interpreted that the term mujaddid can also be understood as plural, thus referring to a group of people. The concept is based on a hadith (a saying of Islamic prophet Muhammad), recorded by Abu Dawood, narrated by Abu Hurairah who mentioned that Islamic prophet Muhammad said:

 According to majority of Muslim scholars, Caliph Umar II (682-720 C.E) is considered as the first mujaddid in early Islam. After then, Muhammad ibn Idris al-Shafi'i (767–820), Abu Hamid al-Ghazali (1058–1111), Taqi al-Din ibn Taymiyya (1263–1328), leading ideal to Salafi doctrine), Abu Ishaq al-Shatibi (d. 1388), Shah Waliullah Dehlawi (1703–1762), Muhammad ibn 'Abd al-Wahhab (1703–1792), 'Uthman Dan Fodio (1754–1817), Muhammad al-Shawkani (1760–1834), and Muhammad ibn Ali al-Sanusi (1787–1859), etc. have been denominated as  prominent reformers in Islam. In particular, Ibn Taymiyya is regarded as a towering figure in the history of Islamic reformism and his campaigns against mystical interpretation, critique of Taqlid (blind following), creedal polemics against Falsafa, etc. have influenced a wide range of Salafi-oriented reform movements. Starting from the 18th century, numerous Islamic reformers such as Shawkani, Ibn 'Abd al-Wahhab, Mahmud al-Alusi, al-Sanussi, etc. have popularised Ibn Taymiyya's teachings in their quest for tajdid and religious purity.

According to author Juan Eduardo Campo and other scholars, "islah" is used most commonly today in Arabic with respect to the idea of reform, although this usage was not widespread until the modern reform movements of the 19th and 20th centuries; scholars like Muhammad Abduh (1849-1905),  Rashid Rida
(1865-1935), a prominent follower of Ibn Taimiyah); and Mahmud Shaltut (1893-1963)  became popular for their contemporary islah movements.

Scholars' views
Islamic scholar Sayyid Rashid Rida (1865–1935 C.E/ 1282–1354 A.H) considered renewal (Tajdid) and reform (Islah) as a continuous process throughout the history of Islam. As time passes, masses fall into superstitions and innovations due to various reasons. During every era, religious reformers appear to eradicate these heresies and campaign for a return to the pure Islam, by inviting to Qur'an and Sunnah. Rida classified reformers/renewers into two types: i) Major reformers recognised universally by all Muslims ii) Regional reformers. Some of the major reformers of Islamic history in Rida's list included:

 Umar ibn 'Abd al-Aziz (d. 720 C.E/ 101 A.H)
 Ahmad ibn Hanbal (d. 855 C.E/ 241 A.H)
 Abul Hasan al-Ash'ari (d. 936 C.E/ 324 A.H)
  Ibn Hazm al-Andalusi (d. 1064 C.E/ 456 A.H)
 Taqi al-Din Ahmad ibn Taymiyyah (d. 1328 C.E/ 728 A.H)
 Ibn Qayyim al-Jawziyya (d. 1350 C.E/ 751 A.H)

The second type of reformers, whose scholarly impact were limited to particular lands consisted of figures such as:

 Abu Ishaq Al-Shatibi (8th century Andalus)
 Shah Waliullah Dehlwi (12th century South Asia)
 Muhammad ibn 'Abd al-Wahhab (12th century Arabia)
 Muhammad ibn Ali al-Shawkani (13th century Yemen)
 Muhammad Siddiq Hasan Khan (13th century South Asia)

Salafi scholar Salih Al-Munajjid argued in his book "Prophets Methods of correcting People's Mistakes" that, Islah or correct mistakes is a basic aspect in Quran and Hadith and there are 38 prophetic ways to do Islah or correct people. and they are:
Prompt action in correcting mistakes and not relaxing
 Remedy of errors by description of provisions
 Bringing the wrongdoers back to the Shariah and reminding them of the principles they have violated
 Correction of concepts where errors are detected due to errors in concepts
 Correction of mistakes by advice and re-intimidation
 Showing mercy to the wrong-doer
 Don't be too quick to catch mistakes
 Calm behavior with wrongdoers
 Describe the severity of the mistake
 Describing the costs or damages of mistakes
 Teaching the wrongdoer manually or practically
 Bring up the correct option
 Telling ways to avoid making mistakes
 Saying without directly naming the wrongdoer
 To stir up the public against the wrongdoer
 Refraining from cooperating with Satan against the wrongdoer
 Asking to stop wrongdoing
 Instructing the wrongdoer to correct his mistake (a) Returning the wrongdoer's attention to his mistake, so that he can correct his mistake (b) Asking him to redo the work in the correct manner if possible (c) Making the irregular flow of work as regular as possible  Saying (d) Correcting the effects of mistakes (e) Atonement for mistakes
 Just discard the error field and accept the rest
 To repay the creditor and preserve the dignity of the wrongdoer
 In case of bilateral mistakes, listening to both sides and giving instructions about the mistakes of both
 Asking the wrongdoer to seek forgiveness from the one against whom he has wronged
 To remind the wrongdoer of the dignity of the one against whom he has wronged, so that he may feel ashamed and repent.
 Intervening in de-escalation of tensions and rooting out sedition from wrongdoers
 Expressing anger for mistakes
 To turn away from the wrongdoer and avoid controversy in the hope that he will return to the right path
 Rebuke the wrongdoer
 To speak harshly to the wrongdoer
 Turning away from the wrongdoer
 Boycott the wrongdoer
 Baddu'a (curse) against the wrongdoer
 Catching some mistakes and ignoring some mistakes out of compassion for the wrongdoer, so that the entire mistake is realized in a gesture.
 Helping the Muslim to correct his mistakes
 Meeting with the wrongdoer and discussing with him
 Telling about the wrongdoer's condition and mistake on his face
 Interrogate the wrongdoer
 Convince the wrongdoer that his lame excuse is not acceptable
 Paying attention to human mood and instinct

Saudi cleric Khalid Bin Abdullah al-Musleh listed seven obstacles in the way of Tazkiah in his book "Islahul Qulub" (reforming the hearts):
 Shirk
 Rejecting Sunnah and following Bid'ah
 Obeying the instinct and ego (nafs)
 Doubt
 Negligence (ghaflah)
He also listed 8 ways to maintain Tazkiah:
 Reading Quran
 Loving Allah 
 Doing dhikr
 Tawbah and Istighfar
 Supplicate (dua) for hidayah and purify
 Remembering afterlife (Akhirah)
 Reading the biographies of the salafs
 Company of good, honest and pious people.

Politics
Several political groups and parties have been named "Islah" in the 20th and 21st centuries including:
Al-Islah (Yemen), or the Yemeni Congregation for Reform, a political party in Yemen
Al Islah (United Arab Emirates), an Islamist group based in the United Arab Emirates that is affiliated with the Muslim Brotherhood
Islah Party, or Hizb Al-Islah, also known as Egyptian Reform Party, a Salafi political party in Egypt
El-Islah, also known as Movement for National Reform, a moderate Islamist political party in Algeria
El Islah, political party in Mauritania
Hizb el Islah al Suri, a Syrian lobby group based in the United States that was active in the mid to late 2000s
Hizb Al-Islah wa Al-Tanmiyah, an Egyptian liberal political party
Tayar Al-Islah Al-Watani, an Iraqi political party

In popular culture
Rapper Kevin Gates named his debut studio album Islah inspired by his daughter's same name.

See also 
 Islamic modernism
 Islamic views on piety
 Islamic views on sin
 Istighfar
 Tazkiah
 Tawbah

References

External links
 Prophet's Methods Of Correcting People's Mistakes - Muhammad Salih Al- Munajjid (English)

Arabic words and phrases
Islamic terminology